Maisie Summers-Newton  (born 26 July 2002) is a British Paralympic swimmer, competing in S6 disability events. In August 2018, she took gold in the IPC Swimming European Championships SM6 200m individual medley and set a new world record at 2:59.60. She also holds the S6 100m Breaststroke world record in 1:33.92, which she achieved in May 2018 at the British Para-Swimming International Meet. She won two gold medals for Great Britain at the 2020 Summer Paralympics.

Career 
Summers-Newton took gold at the 2019 World Para Swimming Championships in London, England. She created a new world record for the SM6 200m Individual Medley when she beat Yelyzaveta Mereshko from Ukraine. The record had been set earlier that year by Summers-Newton in Glasgow.

In April 2021, at Sheffield's Ponds Forge sports centre, Summers-Newton came second in points in the freestyle swimming to Grace Harvey and beat Ellie Simmonds by 4.2 seconds. In July, she was named as part of the Great Britain team to compete at the postponed 2020 Summer Paralympics in Tokyo, Japan. In 2021 Summers-Newton also set a European record for the 100m breaststroke SB6 with a time of 1:32.34.

At the Paralympics, she won gold in the 200m individual medley, setting a new world record of 2:56.68 in the process. She also won gold in the 100m breaststroke and fourth in the 400m freestyle.

Summers-Newton competed at the 2022 World Para Swimming Championships in Funchal, Portugal, where she won two gold medals. One in the 200m individual medley and another in the 400m freestyle. At the Mixed  freestyle relay 49pts, she came 6th with Alice Tai, James Hollis and Oliver Carter. During the 100m breaststroke SB6 heats, Summers-Newton broke her own European record with a time of 1:32.16, and in the finals she got her third gold.

She won gold at the 2022 Commonwealth Games for Team England during the 100m breaststroke, with a time of 1:32.72 - 10.57 seconds ahead of second place.

At the British Para-Swimming Winter National Meet 2022 at the Tollcross International Swimming Centre in Glasgow, Summers-Newton set four new world records. They were set in the 100m freestyle (S6), 200m individual medley (SM6) and 100m breaststroke (SB6) and the 400m freestyle (S6) events.

Honours and awards 
She was nominated for the 2018 BBC Young Sports Personality of the Year, joining a shortlist of 10 other British athletes.

Her accounts on Instagram and Twitter are verified.

In 2021, she appeared in The Beano's special BeONE edition, along with other sporting heroes like Emma Raducanu and Matty Lee.

Summers-Newton was appointed Member of the Order of the British Empire (MBE) in the 2022 New Year Honours for services to swimming. She received her MBE from Anne, Princess Royal at Buckingham Palace on 12 October 2022.

Just before the start of the 2022 Commonwealth Games in July, she met Charles III (Prince Charles at the time) with Courtney Tulloch as the then prince toured the Athletes' Village.

On 17 November 2022, Summers-Newton won the Citi Disability Sportswoman of the Year award.

References

External links
 
 
 

2002 births
21st-century English women
Living people
British female medley swimmers
Swimmers with dwarfism
World record holders in paralympic swimming
Paralympic swimmers of Great Britain
S6-classified Paralympic swimmers
British female breaststroke swimmers
Place of birth missing (living people)
Swimmers at the 2020 Summer Paralympics
Medalists at the 2020 Summer Paralympics
Paralympic gold medalists for Great Britain
Members of the Order of the British Empire
Medalists at the World Para Swimming Championships
Medalists at the World Para Swimming European Championships
Swimmers at the 2022 Commonwealth Games
Commonwealth Games medallists in swimming
Commonwealth Games gold medallists for England
Medallists at the 2022 Commonwealth Games